Nadezhda Alekseyevna Karpova (born 9 March 1995) is a Russian footballer who plays as a forward for Spanish Primera División club RCD Espanyol and the Russia women's national team.

Yaroslavl-born Karpova made her senior national team debut in June 2016, scoring the second goal in Russia's 2–0 UEFA Women's Euro 2017 qualifying Group 5 win over Turkey in Khimki. She played for Russia at UEFA Women's Euro 2017.

Personal life
Karpova has regularly spoken out against the Russian invasion of Ukraine, calling Putin and Lukashenko "human scum" and war criminals.

She is openly lesbian, having come out in 2022. She is the first openly gay Russian national team athlete, although her status in the team following the revelation is uncertain.

Stance on Russian athletes competing at the Olympics
She opposed Russia's participation at the 2024 Summer Olympics in Paris, stating:

References

External links
 

1995 births
Living people
Valencia CF Femenino players
Sevilla FC (women) players
Russian women's footballers
Russia women's international footballers
Women's association football forwards
Russian expatriate sportspeople in Spain
Expatriate women's footballers in Spain
Primera División (women) players
FC Zorky Krasnogorsk (women) players
FC Chertanovo Moscow (women) players
Footballers from Yaroslavl
Russian Women's Football Championship players
LGBT association football players
Russian LGBT sportspeople
Lesbian sportswomen
Russian activists against the 2022 Russian invasion of Ukraine
Russian dissidents
UEFA Women's Euro 2017 players